Life expectancy in Jamaica was 73 years in 2012.

The Human Rights Measurement Initiative finds that Jamaica is fulfilling 91.1% of what it should be fulfilling for the right to health based on its level of income. When looking at the right to health with respect to children, Jamaica achieves 97.7% of what is expected based on its current income. In regards to the right to health amongst the adult population, the country achieves only 89.2% of what is expected based on the nation's level of income.  Jamaica falls into the "fair" category when evaluating the right to reproductive health because the nation is fulfilling 86.4% of what the nation is expected to achieve based on the resources (income) it has available.

Healthcare
Dr Christophers Tufton is the minister of health.

Health care in Jamaica is free to all citizens and legal residents at the public hospitals and clinics. This, in theory, includes the cost of prescribed medication. There are long queues at public health facilities.  An audit in 2015 identified shortages of manpower, equipment, medications, wheelchairs, stretchers, gloves, beds, and other essential supplies.   3.3% of the national budget is spent on health services.

In Jamaica there are over 330 health centres, 24 public hospitals, the University Hospital of the West Indies, a regional teaching institution partially funded by Regional Governments including Jamaica, 10 private hospitals and over 495 pharmacies.  There are around 5,000 public hospital beds and about 200 in the private sector. See List of hospitals in Jamaica.

References